Hong Kong competed at the 1968 Summer Olympics in Mexico City, Mexico. Eleven competitors, all men, took part in twelve events in three sports.

Sailing

Open

Shooting

Three shooters represented Hong Kong in 1968.
Open

Swimming

Men

References

External links
Official Olympic Reports

Nations at the 1968 Summer Olympics
1968
1968 in Hong Kong sport